Claire Mairie (born 3 November 1977) is a French former para table tennis player who played in international level events. She was diagnosed with rheumatoid arthritis aged 21 and played table tennis since 2003. She has played in team events along with Anne Barneoud, Audrey Le Morvan and Thu Kamkasomphou.

References

External links 
 
 

1977 births
Living people
People from Roncq
Paralympic table tennis players of France
Table tennis players at the 2004 Summer Paralympics
Table tennis players at the 2008 Summer Paralympics
Table tennis players at the 2012 Summer Paralympics
Medalists at the 2004 Summer Paralympics
Medalists at the 2008 Summer Paralympics
French female table tennis players
Paralympic medalists in table tennis
Paralympic bronze medalists for France
Sportspeople from Nord (French department)
20th-century French women
21st-century French women